Manoel "Manny" Santos (11 October 1940 – 2 December 2013) was a Tongan-born New Zealand professional light/light welterweight boxer of the 1960s and 1970s.

Early life and family
Santos was born in Tonga on 11 October 1940. His father, also called Manoel Santos, had a Portuguese father and a Tongan mother, and served with the Māori Battalion during World War II. Santos Snr and his family emigrated from Tonga to Auckland, New Zealand, in 1957.

Boxing career
Santos won the New Zealand Boxing Association lightweight title, the Australasian Light welterweight title, and the British Commonwealth lightweight title. He was a challenger for the Australasian lightweight title against Hector Thompson.

Professional boxing record

Death
Santos died in Auckland on 2 December 2013, and was buried at Manukau Memorial Gardens.

References

External links
Image - Manny Santos

1943 births
2013 deaths
Lightweight boxers
Light-welterweight boxers
Tongan male boxers
New Zealand professional boxing champions
New Zealand male boxers
Tongan emigrants to New Zealand
Commonwealth Boxing Council champions
New Zealand people of Portuguese descent
Burials at Manukau Memorial Gardens